George Killian's Irish Red is a red beer, produced and sold in France by Heineken France, and under license in the US by Molson Coors. Despite the differences in the brewing methods, the marketing of both beers claim legacy to an Irish "original recipe".

George Killian's Irish Red 

George Killian's Irish Red: Premium Lager is a 5.4% abv amber lager brewed by Coors. The brand name was purchased only for sale in the North-American market by Coors from the Pelforth Brewery (Heineken France), who had previously bought it from Lett's Brewery in Ireland, which had closed in 1956.

History 

George Killian's Irish Red is a beer with an Irish heritage, allegedly based on a recipe created at Lett's Brewery in Enniscorthy, Ireland, in 1864. The beer is named after George Killian Lett, the great-grandson of George Henry Lett, who founded the brewery in Enniscorthy. George Killian Lett died at the age of 84 in Enniscorthy, Ireland in December 2010. It was originally an Irish red ale called "Enniscorthy Ruby Ale," and brewed from 1864 to 1956, when the brewery closed and it was discontinued. It is no longer sold in Ireland. The brand name "George Killian's" was purchased by the Pelforth Brewery in France. In the mid 1980s Coors bought the rights to use the brand name "George Killian's Irish Red" in America.  While the name is most often associated with a 5.4% abv amber lager which had become very popular, it was originally marketed by Coors as a 4.9% red ale, George Killian's Irish Red: Red Ale. Due to its popularity, Killian's is credited with popularizing the term "Irish red ale", despite the fact that it is a lager.

George Killian's is currently available in bottles, cans, and kegs. A 12-ounce (355 ml) serving of George Killian's has 162 calories (677 kJ) and 5.4 percent alcohol by volume.

Awards 
1998 - Brewer's Association Beer Cup gold medalist, American-Style Amber Lager
1998 - Great American Beer Festival silver medalist, American-Style Amber Lager
1997 - Great American Beer Festival silver medalist, American-Style Amber Lager

George Killian's Bière rousse 
Heineken France's brand is a 6.5% abv Irish red ale by the name George Killian's Bière Rousse: Bière Spéciale de Tradition Irlandaise. It is currently brewed in the Heineken breweries of Schiltigheim and Marseille.

References 

Molson Coors brands
Heineken brands